Eutropis rudis, commonly known as the rough mabuya or brown mabuya, is a species of skink. It is found in the Maritime Southeast Asia: Indonesia (Borneo, Sumatra, Mentawai Islands, Java, and Sulawesi), Malaysia (Sabah and Sarawak), Philippine Islands, Sulu Islands, as well as on the Nicobar islands of India.

References

Eutropis
Reptiles of India
Reptiles of Indonesia
Reptiles of Malaysia
Reptiles of the Philippines
Fauna of the Andaman and Nicobar Islands
Reptiles of Borneo
Fauna of Sumatra
Reptiles described in 1887
Taxa named by George Albert Boulenger